Bembrops is a genus of fish, it is the type genus of the subfamily Bembropinae of the family Percophidae.

Species
The following species are classified as members of the genus Bembrops: 

 Bembrops anatirostris Ginsburg, 1955
 Bembrops cadenati Das & Nelson, 1996
 Bembrops caudimacula Steindachner, 1876
 Bembrops curvatura Okada & Suzuki, 1952
 Bembrops filiferus Gilbert, 1905
 Bembrops gobioides (Goode, 1880)
 Bembrops greyi Poll, 1959
 Bembrops heterurus (Miranda Ribeiro, 1903)
 Bembrops macromma Ginsburg, 1955
 Bembrops magnisquamis Ginsburg, 1955
 Bembrops morelandi Nelson, 1978
 Bembrops nelsoni Thompson & Suttkus, 2002
 Bembrops nematopterus Norman, 1939
 Bembrops ocellatus Thompson & Suttkus, 1998
 Bembrops platyrhynchus (Alcock, 1894)
 Bembrops quadrisella Thompson & Suttkus, 1998
 Bembrops raneyi Thompson & Suttkus, 1998

References

Percophidae